The Muslim Nationalist Party was a political party in pre-independence India by M. C. Chagla. Its most prominent leader was Asaf Ali. The party was founded on grounds of support for the Indian independence movement and opposition to the All India Muslim League and the partition of India. The party did not explicitly support or associate itself with the Indian National Congress, but did endorse secularism and a united India.

Indian independence movement
Political parties in India